Star-ving is a web series of episodes running eight to ten minutes, based very loosely on the life of David Faustino from Married... with Children. His co-star is Corin Nemec, who played the title character in Parker Lewis Can't Lose.  The start date for the episodes was January 16, 2009. The series is a production of FNB Entertainment LLC in association with Sony Pictures Television, webcast on Crackle.

History
In 2006, Faustino and his writing partners, Corin Nemec and Todd Bringewatt, started a production company called F.N.B. Entertainment. In 2007, they wrote a two-page treatment for Star-ving, which they took to director Sam Kass, a former writer and producer on Seinfeld.  After shooting the pilot, they took it to Crackle, where twelve webisodes were ordered. In the series, "Faustino plays an exaggerated version of himself — he's broke, can't find a job and his wife has left him for Coolio." Faustino has said of the show, "We don't push the envelope, we're shredding it."

Cast
David Faustino: The star. It's been ten years since Married... with Children and he is frustrated with his lot in life. He is "freakishly short" and his only source of income is from a porn shop left to him by a crazed, deceased fan.
Corin Nemec: Faustino's sidekick.  He is also broke, despite his three seasons as star of Parker Lewis Can't Lose. He helps Faustino run the porn shop.
Faustino's Married... with Children co-stars, Katey Sagal, Christina Applegate and Ed O'Neill, make cameo appearances in the series as themselves.

Episodes

References

External links
Hey Bud, How's It Going? The Los Angeles Times
 Hey, Bud, What Comes After Our 15 Minutes?, New York Times article on the show

2009 web series debuts
2009 web series endings
American comedy web series
Crackle (streaming service) original programming